Francis John Sullivan (September 22, 1892February 19, 1976) was an American humorist, best remembered for creating the character Mr. Arbuthnot the Cliche Expert.

Life 
Sullivan was born in Saratoga Springs, New York, to Dennis and Catherine (Shea) Sullivan. and graduated from Cornell University in 1914. He worked for The Saratogian newspaper until he was drafted in 1917. Upon his discharge, Sullivan moved to New York City and worked for several papers as a reporter and feature writer.

Sullivan wrote his first article for The New Yorker in 1925, the year it was founded. His most celebrated character, Mr. Arbuthnot, created in 1934, made his debut in the issue of August 31, 1935 in "The Cliche Expert Takes the Stand". In one story Mr. Arbuthnot was asked what he did for exercise, and he replied,  "I keep the wolf from the door, let the cat out of the bag, take the bull by the horns, count my chickens before they are hatched, and see that the horse isn't put behind the cart or stolen before I lock the barn door".

The last Mr. Arbuthnot story, "The Cliche Expert Testifies On the Campaign", appeared in The New Yorker on September 13, 1952.

According to The Encyclopedia of American Humorists, the play Arsenic and Old Lace was given its title when the producers adapted the title of a collection of humor pieces by Sullivan called Broccoli and Old Lace.

Sullivan never married. He returned to Saratoga Springs in the 1960s and lived there until his death in 1976.

Sullivan was a peripheral member of the famous Algonquin Round Table.

"Frank Sullivan Place", formerly High Street, is named for him in Saratoga Springs, New York. It forms the border of the Saratoga Racecourse property near the track clubhouse.

He is credited with the line, "This is either a forgery or a damned clever original!".

Bibliography

Books

 (also titled A Moose in the House)

Reporting and other short pieces

References

1892 births
1976 deaths
American humorists
Cornell University alumni
People from Saratoga Springs, New York
Writers from New York City
American military personnel of World War I
Burials in Saratoga County, New York
The New Yorker people
20th-century American male writers
Algonquin Round Table